The Weizer Building at 11801 Buckeye Rd. in Cleveland, Ohio was built in 1925.  It was listed on the National Register of Historic Places in 2002.  It is a Beaux Arts style building.

In 2017, the building is a mental health treatment facility, Beech Brook Outpatient.

See also
Weizer Building (8935 Buckeye Road, Cleveland, Ohio)

References

Commercial buildings on the National Register of Historic Places in Ohio
Beaux-Arts architecture in Ohio
Commercial buildings completed in 1925
Buildings and structures in Cleveland
National Register of Historic Places in Cleveland, Ohio
Buckeye-Shaker